Tulus is a Norwegian black metal band formed in Oslo in 1991. Members of Tulus later went and formed the band Khold. After Khold went on hold in 2006, Blodstrup and Sarke resurrected Tulus. Tulus has a "fourth member": Blodstrup's wife, Hildr (Hilde Nymoen), who writes all lyrics for both Tulus and Khold.

Discography 
 Studio albums
 Pure Black Energy (1996)
 Mysterion (1998)
 Evil 1999 (1999)
 Biography Obscene (2007)
 Olm og Bitter (2012)
 Old Old Death (2020)

 Demos
 Demo I (1993)
 Samlarens Kammer (1994)
 Midtvintermåne (1995)

 Compilation albums
 Cold Core Collection (2000)

Band members

Current members 
Crowbel – bass
Sarke – drums
Blodstrup – vocals, guitars
Hildr – lyrics

Former members 
Sir Graanug – bass
Gottskalk – bass
Eikind – guitars, bass
Anders Hunstad – keyboards

See also 

 Early Norwegian black metal scene

External links 
 Tulus at AllMusic

Norwegian black metal musical groups